TA3 was a TV channel broadcast on the 3rd broadcasting circuit in the Slovak Republic (then a constituent republic within Czechoslovakia) from 6 July 1991 to 30 September 1992. The channel was created in order to replace the federal channel OK3 and started to broadcast on the same frequencies. Its programming consisted mostly of retransmission of foreign news channels and alternative programming.

Mass media in Slovakia